Nortkerque is a commune in the Pas-de-Calais department in the Hauts-de-France region of France.

Its name comes from Dutch and means "North church" (compare nearby Zutkerque).

Geography
Nortkerque 15 miles (24 km) northwest of Saint-Omer, at the junction of the D224 and the D226 roads, half a mile from the A26 autoroute.

Population

Places of interest
 The church of St. Martin, dating from the eighteenth century.
 Two chateaux.
 A ‘Triumphal arch’, near the cemetery.

See also
Communes of the Pas-de-Calais department

References

External links

 Unofficial Nortkerque website

Communes of Pas-de-Calais